Jim Welker (born 1947) is an American politician. He is a Republican who was, until January 2007, a Colorado state representative of District 51.  He is a communications businessman. Welker was first appointed into public office in 2003 and served on two committees, Business Affairs and Labor, and Transportation and Energy.

He completed Bachelor of Science degrees in math and science from Montana State University in 1969. He is married to Claudia and has two children: Claudette, 31, and Craig, 29.

Controversies and criticism
Welker has come under fire from various groups in the course of his three-year political career.

Selling of confidential data concerning US Citizens
Universal Communications Co. in Loveland, Colorado, is one of 15 companies under federal investigation for illegal selling of private information such as driver license numbers, personal cell phone records, and social security numbers.  On June 21, 2006, he was subpoenaed to testify at a congressional hearing. He invoked his fifth amendment rights. Welker acknowledged his Universal Communications Co. "sold cell-phone records but has denied the firm did anything illegal and has maintained the records weren't sold to the general public."  The FBI said databrokers "probably act illegally."

Controversial remarks

Homosexuals

Welker forwarded anti-gay emails in 2003. He was warned by the Republican Party to not forward "offensive material."  The material forwarded "claimed that gay men regularly ingest the urine and feces of their partners, leading to massive outbreaks of various diseases," this report was written by Lynn Bartels for the Rocky Mountain News of Denver Colorado.

External links

Colorado a hub for data brokers
Racially charged email
Refusal to reply to citizen and newspaper concerns
Official campaigning/bio info
campaign contributions to Musgrave

1950 births
Living people
Republican Party members of the Colorado House of Representatives